Phyllobrostis is a genus of moths in the family Lyonetiidae.

Species
eremitella-group
 Phyllobrostis eremitella  De Joannis, 1912
 Phyllobrostis tephroleuca  (Meyrick, 1913)
 Phyllobrostis calcaria  Meyrick, 1911
 Phyllobrostis apathetica  (Meyrick, 1921)
daphneella-group
 Phyllobrostis daphneella  Staudinger, 1859
 Phyllobrostis jedmella  Chretien, 1907
 Phyllobrostis hartmanni  Staudinger, 1867
 Phyllobrostis fregenella  Hartig, 1940
 Phyllobrostis farsensis  Mey, 2006
 Phyllobrostis nuristanica  Mey, 2006
 Phyllobrostis kandaharensis  Mey, 2006

Former species
Phyllobrostis argillosa Meyrick, 1911 was described from a single male
from Kranspoort near Pretoria. It is misplaced in Lyonetiidae and even in Yponomeutoidea. The species should probably be placed in the superfamily Tineoidea, probably in Tineidae.

References

External links
Revision of the genus Phyllobrostis Staudinger, 1859 (Lepidoptera, Lyonetiidae)

Lyonetiidae
Ditrysia genera